The Miracle Cars scam was an advance-fee scam that ran from 1997 to 2002 by Californians James R. Nichols and Robert Gomez. In its run of just over four years, over 4,000 people bought 7,000 cars that did not actually exist, causing over 21 million US dollars stolen from the victims.

The scam
 

Robert Gomez was a 19-year-old working as a security guard in Los Angeles, who lives with his co-worker and friend, James R. Nichols. Gomez claims that he was the adopted son of John Bowers, a wealthy food company executive living in Texas. Later, Gomez would tell Nichols that John Bowers had died, and asked Nichols to serve as the executor of the Bowers estate. Nichols would also later claim to have, on an earlier occasion, actually met Bowers at a country club in Long Beach, California. A year after they met, Gomez and Nichols decided to save money, and would both move into the home of Nichols' parents in Carson, California. 

Three years later, just before Christmas 1997, the then 23-year-old Gomez stepped into the "discipleship pulpit" of the Christ Christian Home Missionary Baptist Church in nearby Compton, where the Nichols family were longtime members. Gomez introduced himself as Bowers' adopted son, and heir to an estate valued at $411 million. Gomez also announced that Bowers had been a devout Christian, and had left instructions in his will that his estate should "gift" a fleet of 16 low-mileage company and personal cars to fellow believers. While the vehicles were not individually identified by their vehicle identification numbers or the serial numbers of their legal titles, they were described by their general types. The vehicles were described as late model leased luxury coupes and sedans (i.e., BMWs, Mercedes-Benz, Lexus, and Cadillac), now the property of the deceased’s estate. Over the years, they had been used for both personal and company purposes, and had been based around the country for personal and chauffeured company use.

Gomez stated that Bowers' Last Will and Testament intended that the cars were to be gifted to Christians as a charitable bequest. The Christian beneficiary only had to pay a "conveyance fee" of roughly $1,000 to $1,100, each vehicle's estimated title transfer and tax liability. Once the estate cleared probate, the vehicles would be delivered to their new owners. Gomez stated that the key details that could be used in the verification of this bequest (the vehicle VINs and/or their State's Title serial numbers, which were the definitive evidence of each vehicles’ actual existence) were under seal, not to be publicly disclosed by the probate court until the estate's final disposition, objections disposed of (if any) and a final probate of the "Bowers Estate" had been entered as both ruling and Order by the Court. Until that time, it was plausible that the actual details of the dimensions of an "estate", and the proposed disposition of its contents, could be withheld from general release and/or publication by a gag order imposed by the probate judge. Therefore, Gomez suggested, that to speed the process of “God’s” cars going to “God’s” people, the intended recipients should pay their “transfer fees” in advance, up front, and then simply await the delivery of their cars.

Later that day, church members flocked to Nichols' mother, Rose, with money orders and cashier's checks, as Nichols had said was required by the estate's "lawyers". One of them called the cars "miracle cars," since Bowers had intended them to be miracles for people who had led dreary lives. The name stuck. Almost overnight, Rose Nichols "sold" $30,000 worth of cars to relatives and church members. Gomez and Nichols soon claimed that the fleet of company cars was much larger than the original 16 vehicles; and before long the proceeds reached $1 million. News of the "miracle cars" was spread by word of mouth through the Christian community, and Rose was overwhelmed by the number of people coming forward. Nichols and Gomez then designated several "team captains" to handle "miracle car" sales. It wasn't long before they were overwhelmed as well.

Later in 1998, Rose Nichols received a call from Gwen Baker, who worked for Primerica Financial Services in Memphis, Tennessee. She'd heard about the Miracle Cars through her nondenominational charismatic church in Memphis, but was not just interested in buying one of them. Baker also recognized the money-making potential in helping to sell them. She flew to Los Angeles to meet Nichols and Gomez, who immediately hired her as a "National Finder" — a professional sales manager who could also set up a central office for operations. Baker then quit her job at Primerica, and opened an office in Memphis. She worked primarily through pastors of other churches in the Southeast who told their flocks about the cars. By early 2000, two other "National Finders" had joined the sales.

The sales figures were staggering. Conway made $992,000 worth of finder's fees in 2000 alone. A professional car finder in the Los Angeles area bought $120,000 in one day. Former NFL players Neil Smith and Ricky Siglar bought a total of $700,000 worth of cars.

The promised delivery date was "pushed back" numerous times. However, the Miracle Cars team readily distributed refunds to those who wanted refunds. As was typical of similar schemes, earlier marks could always be refunded their money in full—but were paid out of the proceeds of later victims. Additionally, no one was promised anything of actual cash value other than their miracle car. Once a victim decided they no longer were able to wait, they were only entitled to the full refund of the $1000 to $1100 they had paid. Out of 1,000 marks in a month, 80 percent were willing to wait and that 10 percent were asking for a refund.  Gomez and Nichols could easily meet the $100,000 in refund payments to the 10 percent who wanted their money back. To ensure that those willing to wait wouldn't eventually demand their money back, Gomez used his friendship with the finance manager of a Toyota dealership in Gardena to fabricate letters stating that the cars were being stored in secure lots across the Los Angeles area.

As it turned out, there was no John Bowers, no estate, and no probate case. Most importantly, there were no cars. The money was actually being used primarily to finance Gomez's ambitions of becoming a professional gambler. Knowing that the holding companies for the casinos had names that sounded much like those of banks, he had Nichols wire the proceeds from the scam to his accounts at the casinos.  He once won $1 million playing pai gow poker, and often gambled with Larry Flynt. Nichols and Gomez ended their partnership in September 2001. Nichols used some of the proceeds from the scam to open a custom car parts business in Las Vegas.

Investigation & Trial
Higginsville police chief Cindy Schroer heard about the large number of Miracle Cars being sold in her town, and was very suspicious. Eventually, at the end of 2000, she wrote an incident report and sent it to Missouri's attorney general. The report eventually wound up in the office of Todd Graves, the U.S. Attorney for Missouri's Western District. In turn, he turned the case over to one of his assistants, Dan Stewart. An investigation was immediately launched, headed by U.S. Postal Inspector Steve Hamilton and IRS fraud expert Gary Marshall.

Over the next two years, Hamilton and Marshall painstakingly followed the money trail. Initially thinking that the "National Finders" were the ringleaders, they contacted all three of them. The FBI tapped phones, monitoring conversations with Baker and Conway, who continued to sell cars even after being warned that the scheme may have been illegal. Eventually, Hamilton and Marshall discovered that Gomez, Nichols, Baker and Conway had fleeced their customers of $21.1 million, $8.6 million went toward refunds.

On May 8, 2002, a Kansas City grand jury indicted Gomez, Nichols and Baker on 23 counts each for interstate fraud and money laundering. Gomez was arrested on June 10, 2002 at a casino owned by Flynt.  Nichols surrendered to authorities on July 20 at his attorney's office. Baker and Conway later self-surrendered to the FBI, and Conway was later added to the indictment.

On May 2, 2003, Conway pleaded guilty to felony tax evasion before U.S. District Court Judge Nanette K. Laughrey; she hadn't paid taxes on the finder's fees earned in 2000. In return, she agreed to testify against Nichols and Gomez. She was sentenced to 14 months in federal prison and ordered to pay $4.9 million in restitution.

On May 15, Baker pleaded guilty to two counts of interstate fraud before Laughrey in return for her testimony against Nichols and Gomez. She was sentenced to five years in prison and ordered to pay $12.5 million in restitution.

Gomez and Nichols pleaded not guilty and took their chances with a trial in Kansas City, even though they risked spending the rest of their lives in prison if convicted (the charges carried a maximum sentence of 460 years in prison).

During the trial, witness after witness testified about how they had been duped. Car dealer Randy Lamb lost $218,000 in the scam, and told the court that his losses nearly bankrupted him and kept his mother from retiring as planned. Greg Ross, a car salesman in San Juan Capistrano, who lost $120,000, testified that he demanded to speak with the manager of the bank servicing the Bowers estate. A few days later, Ross got a call from Bob Burrows, a loan officer with First Bank and Trust in Lakewood, California. Burrows disclosed enough details about the account to make Ross feel somewhat better. But Ross couldn't get in touch with Burrows when he had more questions, and got suspicious when Baker called him wondering why he was checking up on them. Finally, Burrows called back, but while the "Bob Burrows" Ross spoke with a few days earlier had an unmistakable African-American accent, this Burrows had a New England accent. Nichols took the stand in his own defense, portraying himself as Gomez' victim.

On June 5, 2003, both men were found guilty of all 46 counts - 23 each of interstate fraud and money laundering. Gomez was sentenced to 21 years and 10 months in federal prison, and Nichols was sentenced to 24 years and four months; Nichols drew the stiffer sentence because Laughrey found he'd perjured himself on seven occasions during his testimony. Both were also ordered to pay $12.5 million in restitution. Gomez was fined an additional $8.7 million - an amount presumed missing. It was never established who was mainly responsible for the scam.

Aftermath
The sentences were upheld on appeal to the 8th Circuit Court of Appeals.

On March 15, 2007, Laughrey approved a final restitution plan. Under this plan, 2,300 people who didn't get refunds will be compensated on a pro rata basis. It is not known whether the missing $8.7 million was ever recovered. Checks started going out in the mail in March 2008; victims received six percent of their total loss.

John Phillips III wrote two articles on the scam for Car and Driver, based on several interviews and letters from people involved in the case. In 2006, he wrote God Wants You to Roll, a book chronicling the scam and trial.

In 2009, a documentary on the scam as part of the series American Greed aired on CNBC.

References

External links
FAQ on case from office of U.S. Attorney for the Western District of Missouri
Miracle Cars Fraud at Snopes.com
God Wants You to Roll by John Phillips III
A video explaining Miracle Cars Scam on Youtube

Confidence tricks
Consumer fraud
Car crime